KU:PALM is the fifth album by Photek, released October 23, 2012. The song "Pyramid" from the album was made available as a free download on October 4. KU:PALM is Photek's first full-length album of all-new material since Solaris, released in 2000.

Track listing
 "Signals" - 5:57	
 "Quadrant" - 5:21	
 "Aviator" - 6:24	
 "Pyramid" - 4:28	
 "Shape Charge" - 6:01	
 "Munich" - 4:35	
 "Quevedo" - 5:04	
 "Mistral" - 5:15	
 "Oshun" - 5:05	
 "Sleepwalking" (featuring Linche) - 6:11	
 "One of a Kind" (featuring Breakage and Veronika Coassolo) - 5:48	
 "This Love" (featuring Ray LaMontagne) - 5:35

External links

References 

Photek albums
2012 albums